Claude-Henri Plantier (1813–1875) was the Catholic Bishop of Nîmes from 1855. He was strongly Ultramontanist and anti-Protestant

He was an important figure in the debates on papal infallibility, with Louis Pie, Bishop of Poitiers, leading up to and at Vatican I. Some of his comments brought a reaction from Bismarck.

He was also an opponent of bullfighting, publishing a pastoral letter hostile to it in 1863.

Works
Règles de la vie sacerdotale (1859)
Pie IX défenseur et vengeur de la vraie civilisation (1866)
Sur les Conciles généraux (1869)

Notes

External links
  Biography
 

1813 births
1875 deaths
19th-century French Catholic theologians
Bishops of Nîmes